James Edward 'Ted' Dawson (1923 – 27 October 2019) was an Australian rugby league footballer who played in the 1940s and 1950s.

A lifetime in rugby league
One old man's long life in Rugby League was rewarded when 94 year old Ted Dawson of Waratah-Mayfield was asked to present trophy awards to the Waratah-Mayfield Cheetahs players for winning their division in 2017.
Ted's long life with the Waratah-Mayfield Rugby League Club started as a 12 year old schoolboy during the great depression years in 1935. At that time Ted was selected to represent NSW schools on a one-month tour of Queensland but had to provide 6 Pounds towards the cost. This amount could not be afforded by his family but the Waratah-Mayfield Rugby League District Club heard of Ted's plight & took the hat around. Ted was able to make the tour & that gesture from the club has never been forgotten.

Ted's long Service to the club there after are as follows: 1935 State-NSW V Queensland aged 12 years, 1942 Waratah-Mayfield 19 years, 1944 Waratah-Mayfield 21 years, 1947 NSW Country v City 24 years, 1948 NSW Country v City 25 years, 1948 NSW Country V New Zealand 25 years, 1948 Newcastle v New Zealand 25 years, 1948 Newcastle v Queensland 25 years, 1949 NSW Country v City 26 years, 1949 New South Wales v Queensland 26 years, 1950 Bigga-Canberra Area Player Coach 27 years, 1950 Country Monaro v England 27 years, 1950 NSW Country v City aged 27 years.

St. George
In 1951, Dawson transferred to St. George as a possible replacement for Frank Facer, who had recently retired from playing. After completing one season, Dawson was forced to retire due to a rib cartilage continuous problem aged 28 years.

Dawson returned to Newcastle and was approached by Waratah to coach in 1952. After a number of years coaching joined the administration of the club & later on as Director of Newcastle Rugby League.

Accolades

LIFE MEMBERSHIP's:
1. Waratah Mayfield Junior & Senior Bodies
2. Newcastle Rugby League as Director.

References

Australian rugby league players
Rugby league hookers
St. George Dragons players
Australian rugby league administrators
New South Wales rugby league team players
Country New South Wales rugby league team players
1923 births
2019 deaths